Ralph Baum (4 October 1908 – 1987) was a French film producer and production manager particularly associated with Max Ophüls whose career spanned from 1930 to 1985 across more than 50 films. He also directed four films.

Selected filmography
 A Man Has Been Stolen (1934)
 Maya (1949)
 La Ronde (1950)
 Paris Nights (1951)
 Marianne of My Youth (1955)
 Liza (1972)

References

External links

1908 births
1987 deaths
French film producers
French film directors
German emigrants to France